KPMB may refer to:

 KPMB (FM), a radio station (88.5 FM) licensed to Plainview, Texas, United States
 Pembina Municipal Airport (ICAO airport code KPMB) in Pembina, North Dakota, United States
 KPMB Architects, an architecture firm based in Toronto, Ontario, Canada